The men's vault competition was one of eight events for male competitors in artistic gymnastics at the 1976 Summer Olympics in Montreal. The qualification and final rounds took place on July 18, 20, and 23rd at the Montreal Forum. There were 90 competitors from 20 nations, with nations competing in the team event having 6 gymnasts while other nations could have up to 3 gymnasts. The event was won by Nikolai Andrianov of the Soviet Union, the nation's fifth gold medal in the men's vault; it was the seventh consecutive Games that the Soviets had a gymnast place in the top two. Andrianov became the third man to win multiple vault medals, adding to his 1972 bronze. Japan returned to the vault podium after a one-Games absence, with Mitsuo Tsukahara taking silver and Hiroshi Kajiyama bronze.

Background

This was the 14th appearance of the event, which is one of the five apparatus events held every time there were apparatus events at the Summer Olympics (no apparatus events were held in 1900, 1908, 1912, or 1920). Three of the six finalists from 1972 returned: bronze medalist Nikolai Andrianov of the Soviet Union, fourth-place finisher Sawao Kato of Japan, and sixth-place finisher Peter Rohner of Switzerland. The 1974 vault world champion, Shigeru Kasamatsu of Japan, did not compete in Montreal. Andrianov had been the runner-up.

Israel made its debut in the men's vault. The United States made its 13th appearance, most of any nation, having missed only the inaugural 1896 Games.

Competition format

The event used a "vaulting horse" aligned parallel to the gymnast's run (rather than the modern "vaulting table" in use since 2004). Each nation entered a team of six gymnasts or up to three individual gymnasts. All entrants in the gymnastics competitions performed both a compulsory exercise and a voluntary exercise for each apparatus. The scores for all 12 exercises were summed to give an individual all-around score. These exercise scores were also used for qualification for the apparatus finals. The two exercises (compulsory and voluntary) for each apparatus were summed to give an apparatus score. The top 6 in each apparatus participated in the finals, except that nations were limited to two finalists each; others were ranked 7th through 90th. Half of the preliminary score carried over to the final.

Schedule

All times are Eastern Daylight Time (UTC-4)

Results

Ninety gymnasts competed in the compulsory and optional rounds on July 18 and 20. The six highest scoring gymnasts advanced to the final on July 23. Each country was limited to two competitors in the final. Half of the points earned by each gymnast during both the compulsory and optional rounds carried over to the final. This constitutes the "prelim" score.

References

Official Olympic Report
www.gymnasticsresults.com
www.gymn-forum.net

Men's vault
Men's 1976
Men's events at the 1976 Summer Olympics